Kyelle Joelle Revagliatte (born 4 August 1993) is a Gibraltarian footballer who plays as a goalkeeper for Estepona and the Gibraltar women's national team.

Club career 
After spending the majority of her career at Lions Gibraltar & Algeciras, Revagliatte moved to Spain in 2020 to sign for newly formed 4th tier side ADC Esteponense. In April 2022 she departed Esteponense and joined league rivals Torreón Cala Mijas, registering an assist on her debut, a 4-1 Copa de Andalucia win over Marbella Promesas.

International career 
Revagliatte made her senior debut for Gibraltar on 24 June 2021 in a 1–4 friendly away loss to Liechtenstein.

Career statistics

International

References 

Living people
Gibraltarian women's footballers
Women's association football goalkeepers
Lions Gibraltar F.C. Women players
ADC Esteponense players
Gibraltar women's international footballers
Gibraltarian expatriate footballers
1993 births
Expatriate women's footballers in Spain
Gibraltarian expatriate sportspeople in Spain